Abdul Karim is Pakistani politician hailing from Tordher, Swabi District. He is served as a member of the Provincial Assembly of Khyber Pakhtunkhwa from August 2018 till January 2023 and Advisor to the Chief Minister on Industries. He belongs to the Pakistan Tehreek-e-Insaf.

On 14 September 2018, he was appointed as special assistant to the Chief Minister of Khyber Pakhtunkhwa Mahmood Khan for commerce and industries.

Education
Abdul Karim earned his degree in BA.

Political career 
In 2013, he was elected to the Khyber Pakhtunkhwa Assembly on the ticket of Qaumi Watan Party. In 2018, he left Qaumi Watan Party to join Pakistan Tehreek-e-Insaf.

In 2018, he was re-elected to the KPK assembly on the ticket of Pakistan Tehreek-e-Insaf.

External links
 Official Facebook

References

Living people

Pashtun people
Khyber Pakhtunkhwa MPAs 2013–2018
People from Swabi District
Qaumi Watan Party politicians
Year of birth missing (living people)
Pakistan Tehreek-e-Insaf MPAs (Khyber Pakhtunkhwa)